Nikolay Krastev (born 29 October 1979) is a former Bulgarian footballer, who played as a defender and is currently manager of Neftochimic Burgas. Krastev was a central/left defender and captain of the team. He started his career in Naftex Burgas's youth teams.

Career
Krastev played nine seasons for Naftex Burgas. In 2003 and 2004, he was a part of Bulgaria national football team, being capped six times. He signed with Chernomorets Burgas in June 2006 on a free transfer and played in Intertoto Cup 2008 matches against the Slovenian ND Gorica and the Swiss Grasshopper Club Zürich. In January 2011, he signed with Chernomorets Pomorie.

On 23 June 2017, Krastev was appointed as manager of Neftochimic Burgas. On 6 October 2017, following a Board of Directors' decision, Krastev was demoted to assistant manager with Blagomir Mitrev taking charge of the club. He once again became head coach in October 2020, after Viktorio Pavlov was relieved of his duties as manager.

Personal life
Krastev's son, Dimo Krastev, is also a professional footballer.

References

External links

1979 births
Living people
Sportspeople from Burgas
Bulgarian footballers
Bulgarian football managers
Bulgaria international footballers
First Professional Football League (Bulgaria) players
Neftochimic Burgas players
PFC Chernomorets Burgas players
FC Pomorie players

Association football defenders